Listening is the conscious processing of the auditory stimuli that have been perceived through hearing.

Listening or The Listening may also refer to:

Film
 Listening (film), a 2003 British short film by Kenneth Branagh
 The Listening (film), a 2006 Italian film

Music
 Listening (band), an American psychedelic rock band from Boston
 The Listening (band), an American rock band from Washington state
 The Listening (Lights album) or the title song, 2009
 The Listening (Little Brother album) or the title song, 2003
 "Listening" (song), by Pseudo Echo, 1983
 "Listening", a song written by Irving Berlin
 "Listening", a song by Pet Shop Boys, a B-side of the single "Memory of the Future"
 "Listening", a song by the Used from In Love and Death
 "The Listening", a song by Eyes Set to Kill from Broken Frames

See also
 Listen (disambiguation)
 Listener (disambiguation)